Cross Lake is a lake in South Algonquin, Nipissing District, Ontario, Canada, about  south of the community of Madawaska. Ontario Highway 523 runs just east of the lake, and the settlement of Cross Lake lies between the highway and the lake.

Hydrology
The name refers to its roughly cross-like shape, with one line running from the northwest to southeast, and the other from west-southwest to east-northeast.

There are four unnamed creek inflows, one at the west, one at the south, one at the north from Lyell Long Lake and one at the southeast from Hawk Lake. The primary outflow, at the southwest, is Moore Creek towards McKenzie Lake, which flows into the Madawaska River, and via the Ottawa River into the St. Lawrence River.

See also
List of lakes in Ontario

References

Lakes of Nipissing District